Velpke is a municipality in the district of Helmstedt, in Lower Saxony, Germany. It is situated approximately 20 km north of Helmstedt, and 10 km east of Wolfsburg. The Municipality Velpke includes the villages of Büstedt, Meinkot, Velpke and Wahrstedt. Velpke is also the seat of the Samtgemeinde ("collective municipality") Velpke.

References

Helmstedt (district)